Politarch (politarches; plural πολιτάρχαι, politarchai) was a Hellenistic and Roman-era Macedonian title for an elected governor (archon) of a city (polis). The term had been already attested in the Acts of the Apostles (17:6,8) concerning Thessalonica, as well in modern archaeology. The institution is called Politarchate and the variant ptoliarchos appears in a poetic epigram. The first evidence of the title is dated to the reign of Perseus in Amphipolis, where the king with two politarchs honoured Artemis Tauropolos after a Thracian campaign. One of the earliest extant inscriptions to use the term "Politarch" was located on the Vardar Gate in Thessaloniki. The Gate was unfortunately destroyed in 1876 but the inscription, which dates to the 2nd Century AD, can now been seen in the British Museum in London.

The title was also used for the local commissioners of the Greek provisional government during the Greek War of Independence.

See also
Macedoniarch

References

The Book of Acts in Its Graeco-Roman Setting Pages 420-430 By David W. J. Gill, Conrad Gempf 
The Macedonian Politarchs in jstor.org

Ancient Greek titles
Antigonid Macedonia
Government of Macedonia (ancient kingdom)
Government of Roman Macedonia